Yllana is a surname. Notable people with the surname include:

Adolfo Tito Yllana (born 1948), Filipino archbishop and apostolic nuncio and since 2015 the Apostolic Nuncio to Australia
Andrés Yllana (born 1974), Argentine football player
Anjo Yllana (born 1968), Filipino actor-comedian, television host and politician
Jomari Yllana (born 1976), Filipino actor, model, race car driver, and concert producer and promoter